Liu Fangping (c.742 in Luoyang – c.779) was a Tang Dynasty poet. Among twenty-six extant poems Moonlit Night and Spring Grief are among the best known.

300 Tang Poems
The Three Hundred Tang Poems is an anthology of poems from the Chinese Tang Dynasty (618–907) first compiled in or around the year 1763 by Sun Zhu (1722–1778), a Qing Dynasty era scholar, who was also known as Hengtang Tuishi (衡塘退士 "Retired Master of Hengtang"). The inclusion of 2 of Liu Fangping's poems in this popular and best-selling collection of poetry gives proof of this poet's notability.

See also
Classical Chinese poetry
List of Three Hundred Tang Poems poets
Tang poetry
Three Hundred Tang Poems

References

External links
 

740s births
779 deaths
Tang dynasty poets
Three Hundred Tang Poems poets
8th-century Chinese poets
Writers from Luoyang
Poets from Henan